The Crowley's Ridge State Park Bathhouse is a historic recreational facility in Crowley's Ridge State Park, located in Greene County, Arkansas.  It is a -story log structure, built on a fieldstone foundation, and is covered with a hip roof.  A wood and log frame ell extends to the building's rear.  The bathhouse was built  by a crew from the Civilian Conservation Corps, and is an excellent local example of the Rustic style architecture popularized by the CCC.

The building was listed on the National Register of Historic Places in 1992.

See also
National Register of Historic Places listings in Greene County, Arkansas

References

Buildings and structures in Greene County, Arkansas
Public baths in the United States
Crowley's Ridge
Government buildings in Arkansas
Government buildings completed in 1935
National Register of Historic Places in Greene County, Arkansas
Park buildings and structures on the National Register of Historic Places in Arkansas
Public baths on the National Register of Historic Places in Arkansas
1935 establishments in Arkansas
Civilian Conservation Corps in Arkansas
Rustic architecture in Arkansas
Buildings and structures completed in 1935